Roelof Koets (1592, Haarlem – 1654, Haarlem) was a Dutch Golden Age painter.

Biography
Koets became a member of the Haarlem Guild of St. Luke in 1654 as vinder. He worked together with the Haarlem still life painters Pieter Claesz and Jan Jansz van de Velde. He himself was influenced by Floris van Dyck and in turn influenced Floris van Schooten. He became the teacher of his son, the later painter Andries Koets. He is not to be confused with the later painter Roelof Koets of Zwolle, who painted mostly portraits.

References

Roelof Koets on Artnet

1592 births
1654 deaths
Dutch Golden Age painters
Dutch male painters
Artists from Haarlem
Dutch still life painters
Painters from Haarlem